Jalan Simpang Renggam–Layang Layang (Johor state route J26) is a major road in Johor, Malaysia.

List of junctions

Roads in Johor